Xyleborini are a tribe of ambrosia beetles (alternatively called subtribe Xyleborina of tribe Scolytini), highly specialized weevils of the subfamily Scolytinae. Much of the ambrosia beetle fauna in Eurasia and the Americas consists of Xyleborini species. Some Xyleborini are notorious invasive species.

Most genera are small or even monotypic, and contain 1-8 dozen species. The type genus Xyleborus contains over 500 species, but it is an unnatural grouping of unrelated species. Key for the world genera of Xyleborini available through a North Carolina State University website.

Genera

 Amasa Lea 1893
 Ambrosiodmus Hopkins, 1915 - sometimes included in Xyleborus
 Ambrosiophilus Hulcr & Cognato 2009
 Arixyleborus Hopkins 1915
 Beaverium Hulcr & Cognato 2009
 Diuncus Hulcr & Cognato 2009
 Cnestus Sampson 1911
 Coptoborus Hopkins, 1915
 Coptodryas Hopkins 1915
 Cryptoxyleborus Schedl, 1937
 Cyclorhipidion Hagedorn, 1912 - includes Terminalinus
 Dryocoetoides Hopkins 1915
 Dryoxylon Bright & Rabaglia 1999
 Eccoptopterus Motschulsky 1863
 Euwallacea Hopkins, 1915 - often included in Xyleborus
 Hadrodemius Wood 1980
 Leptoxyleborus Wood 1980
 Microperus Wood 1980
 Pseudowebbia Browne 1962
 Sampsonius Eggers 1935
 Schedlia Browne 1950
 Streptocranus'' Schedl 1939
 Taphrodasus Wood 1980
 Taurodemus Wood 1980
 Theoborus Hopkins 1915
 Webbia Hopkins 1915
 Xyleborinus Reitter, 1913
 Xyleborus - possibly paraphyletic with Cyclorhipidion Xylosandrus'' Reitter, 1913

References

Footnotes 
Retrieved 2008-JUL-08.

Scolytinae